Word of Mouth is the third album by Mike + The Mechanics, released in 1991.

The album did not chart as well as Living Years, charting at No. 11 in the UK, while the lead single "Word of Mouth" got to No. 13 in the UK and No. 78 in the US. The follow-up singles "A Time and a Place" and "Everybody Gets a Second Chance" both became minor hits in the UK, peaking at No. 58 and No. 56, respectively.

There was some overlap with the marketing of the album and the making of Genesis's We Can't Dance, with Mike Rutherford being committed to both. As such, there was no tour for Word of Mouth.

The song "Get Up" was used in the 1993 film, Rookie of the Year.

Reception

AllMusic suggested that the album was inferior to its predecessors, writing, "The new record led off with two killer pop songs...But within a few months of its release, Word of Mouth had already been banished to the discount racks and budget bins of nearly every record store in the English-speaking world."

Track listing

Personnel 

Mike + The Mechanics
 Mike Rutherford – guitars, bass
 Paul Carrack – vocals (lead: 1, 3, 5, 6, 8, 10), keyboards
 Paul Young – vocals (lead: 2, 4, 7, 9)
 Adrian Lee – keyboards
 Peter Van Hooke – drums

Additional personnel
 Steve Piggot – keyboards
 Ian Wherry – keyboards
 Tim Renwick – guitars
 Pino Palladino – bass
 Martin Ditcham – percussion
 Phil Todd – saxophone
 London Community Gospel Choir – choir (10)
 Kitson Hall Audience – crowd (2)

Production 
 Tracks 1, 3, 5, 8, 9 & 10 – Produced by Christopher Neil, Mike Rutherford and Russ Titelman.
 Tracks 2, 4, 6 & 7 – Produced by Christopher Neil and Mike Rutherford
 Engineers – Rob Eaton (Tracks 1 & 3–10); Mike Punczek  (Track 2).
 Assistant Engineers – Mark Robinson, Jeremy Wheatley and Shaun De Feo.
 Recorded at The Farm; Technical Assistants – Geoff Callingham and Mike Bowen. Olympic Studios, London, except Track 2 at Living Years tour, US 1989.
 Equipment – Dale Newman, Steve Jones and Angela Jewel.
 Mastered by Ted Jensen at Sterling Sound (New York, NY).
 Cover Design – Icon
 Photography – Mike Owen

Charts

Weekly charts

Year-end charts

Certifications

References

Word of Mouth
Word of Mouth
Albums produced by Russ Titelman
Albums produced by Mike Rutherford
Albums produced by Christopher Neil